Donald C. Cox (born November 22, 1937) is an electrical engineer researching wireless communication, currently a professor at University of Nebraska-Lincoln, where he heads the Wireless Communications Research Group. His work on multipath and other propagation problems has been fundamental to the development of mobile phone technology.

Cox was elected a member of the National Academy of Engineering in 1994 for research and leadership in wireless personal communications technologies and systems.

Biography
Cox received a B.S. and an M.S. in electrical engineering from the University of Nebraska in 1959 and 1960, respectively. After 3 years working in communications system design at Wright-Patterson Air Force Base, he attended Stanford University, where he received his Ph.D. in electrical engineering in 1968. Next he went to work at Bell Labs. He became part of Bellcore (now Telcordia Technologies) when it was formed in 1984, and he stayed there until 1993, when he left to take an academic position at Stanford. He has been a member of the IEEE since its formation, and is particularly active in the IEEE Communications Society.

Honors and awards
co-recipient Marconi Prize (1983)
IEEE Alexander Graham Bell Medal (1993)
IEEE Third Millennium Medal (2000)
member, National Academy of Engineering (1994)
Honorary Dr. of Science, University of Nebraska (1983)

External links
 Cox's bio at IEEE History Center, written 1993
 Cox's home page at Stanford

Living people
1937 births
American electrical engineers
Scientists at Bell Labs
University of Nebraska–Lincoln alumni
Stanford University School of Engineering alumni
Stanford University School of Engineering faculty
Members of the United States National Academy of Engineering
American telecommunications engineers